Paul Scott (born 1982) is an American politician from Grand Blanc, Michigan. A member of the Michigan State House of Representatives, Scott was recalled on November 8, 2011.

Early life
Scott graduated from Grand Blanc High School in 2000.    He received his bachelor's degree from the University of Michigan, studied in a master's of public policy program at Harvard University, and received a J.D. degree from the University of Michigan Law School.

Political life
Scott ran for the Michigan State House of Representatives in 2008.  He first faced off against pilot James B. Swenor and businessman Vince Lorraine in the Republican primary and won with 41 percent of the vote.  He then stood against Michael J. Thorp in the general election and defeated him.

After one term as State Representative, Scott ran for the Secretary of State nomination in 2010 but lost the nomination at the Republican State Convention to Ruth Johnson.  In 2010, he won reelection to the 51st district of the Michigan House of Representatives, defeating Art Reyes.

Scott was one of roughly 20 Michigan elected officials targeted for recall efforts in 2011, primarily by voters and interest groups opposed to changes in state education funding mechanisms, taxation of some retirement income and opposition to labor unions.  Voters and the Michigan Education Association, opposed to Scott's actions as the chair of the House Education Committee, launched a recall effort against him. After recall supporters collected enough signatures to put the recall on the November 2011 election ballot in his district, Scott launched a legal challenge against the recall, but the appeal was denied unanimously by the Michigan Supreme Court.  On November 8, 2011 Scott was recalled.

Election history

References

1982 births
Living people
People from Grand Blanc, Michigan
University of Michigan Law School alumni
Harvard Kennedy School alumni
Republican Party members of the Michigan House of Representatives
Recalled state legislators of the United States
African-American state legislators in Michigan
21st-century American politicians
21st-century African-American politicians
20th-century African-American people